Sarecta was the first incorporated town in Duplin County, North Carolina, established in 1787. In 1736, Duplin County (then upper New Hanover County) was the destination of several hundred Ulster Scots (Scotch-Irish) and a handful of Swiss Protestants. They settled on a plot of land, 71,160 acres between the N. E. Cape Fear River and Black River, obtained from the Crown by Henry McCulloh Esq. of London. Their first settlements were Soracta (Sarecta) on the Northeast Cape Fear, an area at the lower end of Goshen Swamp (then called Woodward's Chase), and the grove where the Duplin County Courthouse now stands.

References 
 Duplin history at Rootsweb.com

Geography of Duplin County, North Carolina